Kjell Ivar Larsen (born 18 June 1968) is a Norwegian politician for the Progress Party.

He served as a deputy representative to the Parliament of Norway from Vest-Agder during the terms 2005–2009, 2009–2013 and 2013–2017. He hails from Feda, from a family where both parents and a sister were active Progress Party politicians, and has been deputy mayor of Kvinesdal municipality.

References

1968 births
Living people
People from Kvinesdal
Deputy members of the Storting
Progress Party (Norway) politicians
Vest-Agder politicians